The 2012–13 Second League (known as the Spor Toto 2. Lig for sponsorship reasons) is the third level in the Turkish football. The season began on 9 September 2012. In end of the 2012–2013 season, 4 teams (2 teams in each group) relegate to TFF Third League and 6 teams promote from TFF Third League. Because 36 teams (18 teams in each group) will be competing in 2013–2014 season.

The following are the results to the 2012-2013 TFF Second League.

White Group League table

Red Group League table

Promotion playoffs
All matches were played at Konya Atatürk Stadium.

Quarterfinals

Semifinals

Final

References

TFF Second League seasons
3
Turkey